Synthopsis caelata is a species of minute sea snail, a marine gastropod mollusc in the family Cerithiopsidae. The species was described by Powell in 1930.

References

Gastropods described in 1930
Cerithiopsidae